"Tasty Love" is a 1986 R&B/Soul single by American singer Freddie Jackson.  As the lead single from his second album, Just Like the First Time, it was Jackson's fourth number–one single on the R&B charts, where it was at the top spot for four weeks. The single also made the Hot 100, where it peaked at forty-one.

Charts

Weekly charts

Year-end charts

See also
 List of number-one R&B singles of 1986 (U.S.)

References
 

1986 singles
1986 songs
Freddie Jackson songs
Songs written by Freddie Jackson
Songs written by Paul Laurence
Capitol Records singles